The Olympus VR-310 is a compact digital camera with 10× optical zoom from Olympus.

It is available in four different colours: purple, silver, black, and red.

See also
 Fujifilm FinePix T-series
Pentax Optio

References

External links
 Olympus VR-310 at Olympus UK

VR-310
Cameras introduced in 2011